Farajollah may refer to:

Farajollah Mizani, aka Javanshir, Iranian communist and senior Tudeh Party member
Farajollah Rasaei (1908–2002), the Commander of the Imperial Iranian Navy from 1961 to 1972
Farajollah Salahshoor (8206–2016), Iranian film director

See also
Kur Bolagh-e Farajollah Beygi, a village in Baladarband Rural District, Kermanshah County, Kermanshah Province, Iran
Qaleh-ye Farajollah Beygs a village in Zalu Ab Rural District, Ravansar County, Kermanshah Province, Iran
Qeshlaq-e Farajollah Hajj Sarkhan, a village in Qeshlaq-e Gharbi Rural District, Parsabad County, Ardabil Province, Iran
Qeshlaq-e Farajollah Nemaz, a village in Qeshlaq-e Gharbi Rural District, Parsabad County, Ardabil Province, Iran
Qeshlaq-e Farajollah Qadir, a village in Qeshlaq-e Gharbi Rural District, Parsabad County, Ardabil Province, Iran
Zalakeh-ye Farajollah-e Montazeri, a village in Mahidasht Rural District, Kermanshah County, Kermanshah Province, Iran